The surname Dunn has several different origins. In some cases it is an Anglicised form of the Irish surname Ó Duinn, meaning "grandson of Donn"; the Gaelic Donn was originally a byname, meaning "brown-haired" or "chieftain". Another origin of the surname Dunn is from the Middle English dunn, meaning "dark-coloured"; this name originated as a nickname for one with dark hair. Another origin is from a habitative name, derived from Dun in Angus, Scotland; this place name is derived from the Scottish Gaelic dùn, meaning "fort". Another origin is from the Gaelic donn, meaning "brown". 

Notable people with the surname include

A
Adam Dunn (born 1979), American ball
Alan Dunn (baseball) (born 1961), American baseball player
Alan Dunn (cartoonist) (1900–1974), American cartoonist
Albert Dunn (1864–1937), British politician
Albert T. Dunn (1842–1916), Canadian politician
Alby Dunn (1941–2009), Australian rules footballer
Alexander Dunn (disambiguation), multiple people
Alexandra Dunn (born 1967), American lawyer
Aliyah Dunn (born 1999), New Zealand netball player
Anderson Dunn (born 1944), British police officer
Andrew Dunn (disambiguation), multiple people
Andy Dunn (born 1979), American entrepreneur
Anita Dunn (born 1958), American political strategist
Anne Dunn (born 1929), British artist
Antony Dunn (born 1973), English poet
April Dunn (1986–2020), American activist
Archibald Dunn (1876–1943), Scottish footballer
Archibald Matthias Dunn (1832–1917), English architect
Arlene Dunn, Canadian politician
Arthur Dunn (disambiguation), multiple people
Aubert C. Dunn (1896–1987), American attorney
Aubrey Dunn Sr. (1928–2012), American politician
Aubrey Dunn Jr. (born 1956), American politician
Aura K. Dunn, American politician

B
Barrie Dunn (born 1952), Canadian actor
Barry Dunn (born 1952), English footballer
Beau Dunn (born 1987), American visual artist
Ben Dunn (born 1964), American comic book artist
Bernard J. Dunn (1924–2009), American entrepreneur
Bernie Dunn (1944–2018), Australian politician
Betsy Dunn, American politician
Beverley Dunn, Australian actress
Beverley Dunn (set decorator), Australian set decorator
Bill Dunn (disambiguation), multiple people
Billy Dunn (disambiguation), multiple people
Blanche Dunn (1911–??), American socialite
Bob Dunn (disambiguation), multiple people
Bobby Dunn (1890–1937), American actor
Boyd Dunn, German-American politician
Brandon Dunn (born 1992), American football player
Brian Dunn (disambiguation), multiple people
Bud Dunn (1918–2001), American horse trainer

C
Cameron Dunn (born 1984), American soccer player
Carola Dunn (born 1946), British-American writer
Carolyn Dunn (born 1960), Canadian actress
Cary Dunn (1732–??), American silversmith
Casey Dunn (born 1976), American baseball coach
Casey Dunn (American football) (born 1994), American football player
Catherine Dunn (disambiguation), multiple people
Cathy Dunn (born 1949), American politician
Charles Dunn (disambiguation), multiple people
Cheryl Dunn, American filmmaker
Christopher Dunn (disambiguation), multiple people
Cindy Dunn, American politician
Clair Dunn (1915–1996), American football coach
Clara Dunn (1869–1960), Irish-Canadian nurse
Clare Dunn (born 1987), American musician
Cletus Dunn (born 1948), Canadian politician
Clive Dunn (1920–2012), British actor
Colton Dunn (born 1977), American comedian
Conrad Dunn, American actor
Coye Dunn (1916–2000), American football player
Crawford Dunn (1918–1980), American designer
Crystal Dunn (born 1992), American soccer player

D
Daisy Dunn (born 1987), English author
Damon Dunn (born 1976), American politician
Dan Dunn (disambiguation), multiple people
Dave Dunn (born 1948), Canadian ice hockey player
Dave Dunn (American football) (born 1965), American football coach
David Dunn (disambiguation), multiple people
Debbie Dunn (born 1978), American sprinter
Declan Dunn (born 2000), English footballer
Derek Dunn (born 1995), American dancer
Desmond Robert Dunn (1929–2003), Australian author
Donald Dunn (1941–2012), American guitarist
Donald G. Dunn (1923–2021), American soldier
Dorothy Dunn (1903–1992), American art instructor
Douglas Dunn (born 1942), British poet
Douglas Dunn (choreographer) (born 1942), American choreographer
Dwayne Dunn (born 1973/1974), Australian jockey

E
Eddie Dunn (disambiguation), multiple people
Edward Dunn (disambiguation), multiple people
Edwina Dunn (born 1958), English entrepreneur
Elaine Dunn (born 1933/1934), American singer
Elizabeth Dunn (born 1978), Canadian psychologist
Emily Dunn (disambiguation), multiple people
Emma Dunn (1875–1966), English actress
Emmett Reid Dunn (1894–1956), American zoologist
Eric Dunn (1927–2008), British air force officer
Eric Dunn (cricketer) (1929–2015), New Zealand cricketer
Everett Dunn (1892–1980), American engineer

F
Fayette S. Dunn (1903–1979), American corporate executive
Floyd Dunn (1924–2015), American electrical engineer
Francis Dunn (disambiguation), multiple people
Frank Dunn, Canadian corporate executive
Frank K. Dunn (1854–1940), American jurist
Fred Dunn, Australian rules footballer
Frederic Stanley Dunn (1872–1937), American scholar
Frederick Dunn (disambiguation), multiple people

G
Gabe Dunn (born 1988), American writer
Gano Dunn (1870–1953), American corporate executive
Gary Dunn (born 1953), American football player
Gary Dunn (American football coach), American football coach
Ged Dunn (1946–2021), English rugby union footballer
Geoff Dunn (born 1961), English drummer
Geoffrey Dunn, American film producer
George Dunn (disambiguation), multiple people
Gerald R. Dunn (1934–2005), American politician
Gerold C. Dunn (1911–1980), American attorney
Gertrude Dunn (1932–2004), American baseball player
Gordon Dunn (1912–1964), American discus thrower
Graham Dunn (born 1950), Australian swimmer

H
Halbert L. Dunn (1896–1975), American social figure
Hannah Dunn (born 1991), Australian rules footballer
Harry Dunn (disambiguation), multiple people
Harvey Dunn (disambiguation), multiple people
Hedley Allen Dunn (1865–1942), Australian architect
Henry Dunn (disambiguation), multiple people
Herbert Dunn (disambiguation), multiple people
Hester Dunn (born 1940), Northern Irish activist
Holly Dunn (1957–2016), American singer
Howard H. Dunn (1867–1942), American politician
Hubert Dunn (1933–2020), Northern Irish judge
Hugh Alexander Dunn (1923–2005), Australian diplomat
Hughie Dunn (1875–??), Scottish footballer

I
Iain Dunn (born 1970), English footballer
Ian Dunn (disambiguation), multiple people
Irina Dunn (born 1948), Australian writer
Isaiah Dunn (born 1999), American football player

J
Jack Dunn (disambiguation), multiple people
Jacob Piatt Dunn (1855–1924), American historian
Jacqui Dunn (born 1984), Australian artistic gymnast
Jake Dunn (1909–1984), American baseball player
J. Allan Dunn (1872–1941), American writer
Jan Dunn (born 1963), British filmmaker
Jan Dunn (ceramicist) (1940–2002), Australian ceramicist
Jarryd Dunn (born 1992), English sprinter
J. C. Dunn (1871–1955), British medical officer
Jeffrey Dunn (born 1961), British guitarist
Jeffrey D. Dunn, American broadcast executive
Jerry Dunn (disambiguation), multiple people
James Dunn (disambiguation), multiple people
Jamie Dunn (born 1950), Australian comedian
Jancee Dunn (born 1966), American journalist
Jason Dunn (disambiguation), multiple people
Jean Dunn (disambiguation), multiple people
Jennifer Dunn (1941–2007), American politician
Jim Dunn (disambiguation), multiple people
Joe Dunn (disambiguation), multiple people
John Dunn (disambiguation), multiple people
Jonathon Dunn (born 1989), Vanuatuan cricketer
Josephine Dunn (1906–1983), American actress
Jourdan Dunn (born 1990), British model
J. T. Dunn (born 1989), American professional wrestler
Judith Dunn (born 1939), British psychologist
Julian Dunn (born 2000), Canadian soccer player
Justin Dunn (born 1995), American baseball player

K
Kan Cheong Dunn (1925–2014), Taiwanese diplomat
Karen Dunn (born 1975), American lawyer
Kasey Dunn (born 1969), American football coach
Katherine Dunn (1945–2016), American writer
Kathleen Dunn (disambiguation), multiple people
Katie Dunn (disambiguation), multiple people
Katrina Dunn, Canadian actress
K. D. Dunn (born 1963), American football player
Keith Dunn (disambiguation), multiple people
Ken Dunn (1912–1976), Australian politician
Kevin Dunn (disambiguation), multiple people
Kris Dunn (born 1994), American basketball player
Kyle Bobby Dunn (born 1986), Canadian composer

L
LaceDarius Dunn (born 1987), American basketball player
Lady Dunn (disambiguation), multiple people
Larry Dunn (born 1953), American keyboardist
Laura Dunn (rower) (born 1987), Australian rower
L. C. Dunn (1893–1974), American biologist
Leith Dunn, Jamaican sociologist
Les Dunn (1915–2009), Australian rules footballer
Liam Dunn (1916–1976), American actor
Lin Dunn (born 1947), American basketball coach
Linwood G. Dunn (1904–1998), American visual artist
Lloyd Dunn (born 1957), American musician
Lorraine Dunn (1942–2003), Panamanian track and field athlete
Loren C. Dunn (1930–2001), American religious official
Louis Dunn (1908–1979), South African engineer
Lucinda Dunn (born 1973), Australian ballerina
Lucy Dunn, American attorney
Lydia Dunn (born 1940), Hong Kong businesswoman

M
Mabel B. Dunn (1880–1968), American clubwoman
Marc Dunn (born 1978), American football player
Margaret Dunn, Irish bagpiper
Maria Dunn (born 1986), Guamanian wrestler
Maria Dunn (musician), Canadian musician
Martin Dunn (disambiguation), multiple people
Mark Dunn (born 1956), American author
Martyn Dunn (born 1992), Australian wheelchair tennis player
Mary Dunn (disambiguation), multiple people
Matthew Dunn (disambiguation), multiple people
Matthias Dunn (??–1869), English engineer
Max Dunn (1895–1963), Australian editor
Megan Dunn (disambiguation), multiple people
Michael Dunn (disambiguation), multiple people
Mick Dunn (1897–1966), Australian rules footballer
Mick Dunn (boxer) (1864–1950), Australian boxer
Mignon Dunn (born 1928), American voice teacher
Mitchell Dunn (born 1997), Australian rugby league footballer
Moira Dunn (born 1971), American golfer
Moncena Dunn (disambiguation), multiple people
Mother Dunn (disambiguation), multiple people

N
Nat Dunn, Australian singer-songwriter
Natalie Dunn (born 1956), American roller skater
Nate Dunn (1896–1983), American painter
Nathan Dunn (1782–1844), American businessman
Neal Dunn (born 1953), American politician
Nell Dunn (born 1936), British playwright
Nora Dunn (born 1952), American actress
Norm Dunn (1896–1973), Australian rules footballer
Norman Dunn (disambiguation), multiple people

O
Oscar Dunn (1826–1871), American politician
Olive Jean Dunn (1915–2008), American mathematical statistician

P
Parker F. Dunn (1890–1918), American soldier
Pat Dunn (disambiguation), multiple people
Patricia Dunn (actress) (1930–1990), American actress
Patricia C. Dunn (1953–2011), American corporate executive
Paul Dunn (disambiguation), multiple people
Paula Dunn (born 1964), English sprinter
Perry Lee Dunn (1941–2018), American football player
Pete Dunn (born 1948), American baseball coach
Peter Dunn (disambiguation), multiple people
Pintip Dunn, American author
Poindexter Dunn (1834–1914), American politician
Priscilla Dunn (born 1943), American politician

R
Rachel Dunn (born 1982), English netball player
Rae Dunn (born 1962/1963), American ceramist
Ralph Dunn (1900–1968), American actor
Ralph A. Dunn (1914–2004), American politician
Randall Dunn, American record producer
Randy Dunn, American academic administrator
Randy D. Dunn (born 1982), American politician
Ransom Dunn (1818–1900), American minister
Ray Dunn (1910–1971), Australian sports administrator
Reagan Dunn (born 1970/1971), American politician
Red Dunn (1901–1957), American football player
Reece Dunn (born 1995), British Paralympic swimmer
Reggie Dunn (born 1989), American football player
Richard Dunn (disambiguation), multiple people
Richie Dunn (born 1957), American ice hockey player
Rick Dunn (born 1976), British rower
Robbie Dunn (born 1960), Australian footballer
Robbie Dunn (musician) (born 1951), Irish singer-songwriter
Robert Dunn (disambiguation), multiple people
Robyne Dunn (born 1963), Australian singer
Roma Dunn (born 1943), Australian lawn bowler
Ronald Dunn (disambiguation), multiple people
Rose Dunn (1878–1955), American social figure
Ross E. Dunn (born 1941), American historian
Roy Dunn (1910–2000), American wrestler
Roy Emery Dunn (1886–1985), American businessman and politician
Ryan Dunn (1977–2011), American stunt performer
Ryley Dunn (born 1985), Australian footballer

S
Samantha Dunn (born 1964), Australian politician
Samuel Dunn (disambiguation), multiple people
Sarah Dunn (disambiguation), multiple people
Scott Dunn (disambiguation), multiple people
Sebastian Dunn, British actor
Seymour Dunn (1882–1959), Scottish golfer
Sharon Dunn, Canadian writer
Sheila Dunn (1940–2004), British actress
Simon Dunn (1987–2023), Australian bobsledder
Spencer Dunn, New Zealand rugby league footballer
Spencer Dunn (snooker player) (born 1969), English snooker player
Stephen Dunn (disambiguation), multiple people
Steve Dunn (disambiguation), multiple people
Susan Dunn (born 1954), American soprano
Suzannah Dunn (born 1963), English writer

T
Teala Dunn (born 1996), American actress and YouTuber
Teddy Dunn (born 1980), Australian-American director
Terrence P. Dunn, American business executive
Terry Dunn (born 1953), American basketball coach
Thelma Brumfield Dunn (1900–1992), American medical researcher
Theophilus Dunn (1790–1851), English fortune teller
Thomas Dunn (disambiguation), multiple people
Tim Dunn (disambiguation), multiple people
Todd Dunn (born 1970), American baseball player
Tommy Dunn (1878–1938), Scottish footballer
Tommy Dunn (boxer) (born 1954), English boxer
T. R. Dunn (born 1955), American basketball player
Trevor Dunn (born 1968), American composer
Trieste Kelly Dunn (born 1981), American actress
Troy Dunn (born 1967), American television personality
Troy E. Dunn, American Air Force general

V
Velma Dunn (1918–2007), American diver
Vernon Dunn (1918–2002), American politician
Victoria Dunn (born 1977), British judoka
Vince Dunn (born 1996), Canadian ice hockey player
Vincent Dunn (born 1935), American firefighter
Vinny Dunn (born 1980), New Zealand professional wrestler
Viv Dunn (1895–??), Australian rugby union footballer
Vivian Dunn (1908–1995), British conductor

W
Warrick Dunn (born 1975), American football player
Wendell E. Dunn (1894–1965), American educator
Wendell E. Dunn Jr. (1922–2007), American chemist
William Dunn (disambiguation), multiple people
Williamson Dunn (1781–1854), American judge
Willie Dunn (1941–2013), Canadian singer-songwriter
Willie Dunn (golfer) (1864–1952), English golfer
Winfield Dunn (born 1927), American politician
Winifred Dunn (1898–1977), American screenwriter

X
Xavier Dunn, Australian singer-songwriter

Z
Zac Dunn (born 1991), Australian boxer

Fictional characters
Dan Dunn, titular secret agent from the 1930s series
Danny Dunn, a character in the many book series

See also
Donne (disambiguation), a disambiguation page for Donne
Dunne (surname), people with the surname "Dunne"
General Dunn (disambiguation), a disambiguation page for Generals surnamed "Dunn"
Governor Dunn (disambiguation), a disambiguation page for Governors surnamed "Dunn"
Justice Dunn (disambiguation), a disambiguation page for Justices surnamed "Dunn"
Senator Dunn (disambiguation), a disambiguation page for Senators surnamed "Dunn"

References

Surnames of Irish origin
Anglicised Irish-language surnames
English-language surnames
Patronymic surnames
Toponymic surnames